Talilt or Aït Si Ali is a village in the Boumerdès Province in Kabylie, Algeria.

Location
The village is surrounded by Meraldene River, Isser River and Boumerdès River and the towns of Beni Amrane and Thénia in the Khachna mountain range.

Notable people

References

Villages in Algeria
Boumerdès Province
Kabylie